Charles "Red" Lillard (February 26, 1944 – March 27, 1997) was an American-born poet and historian who spent much of his adult life in British Columbia and became a Canadian citizen in 1967. He wrote extensively about the history and culture of British Columbia, Southeast Alaska and the Pacific Northwest.

Early life and education

Lillard was born in Long Beach, California and raised in Ketchikan, Alaska. His parents made a living from fishing.  Lillard attended the University of British Columbia, earning a Bachelor of Arts and Master of Fine Arts.

Career
Lillard published several books of poetry; his work was also included in literary publications and anthologies. His collection Shadow Weather was shortlisted for the Governor General's Award.

Lillard wrote extensively, and also collected and published stories, about the history of Canada's west coast. His book Seven Shillings a Year: the History of Vancouver Island won a BC Book Award in 1986. Lillart also wrote many stories of his travels and experiences in an informal style; he has been criticized for including names of people in his reminiscences without explaining who they were.

In 1978, 1979,and 1981 Lillard was co-editor (with Robin Skelton) of three themed issues, "The West Coast Renaissance" of the literary magazine The Malahat Review. In 2016 a foundation was set up in Lillard's name which presents an award each year to an author whose non-fiction work has appeared in The Malahat Review.

He died of cancer, at his home in Oak Bay, British Columbia in 1997. He left his wife, writer Rhonda Batchelor Lillard, and two children, Benjamin (b. 1984) and Joanna (b. 1986).

Bibliography

Poetry
Cultus Coulee - 1971
Drunk on Wood - 1973
Jabble - 1975
Voice, My Shaman - 1976
Poems - 1979 (with Doug Beardsley)
Circling North - 1988
Shadow Weather: Poems, Selected and New - 1996

Fiction
A Coastal Range - 1984 (nominated for the Ethel Wilson Fiction Prize)

Non-fiction
Seven Shillings a Year - 1986
Fernwood Files - 1989 (with J. Ellis)
The Brother, XII, B.C. Magus: A Quest for The Brother, XII - 1989 (with Ron MacIsaac and Don Clark)
Land of Destiny - 1991 (with Michael Gregson)
Just East of Sundown - 1995
A Voice Great Within Us: The Story of Chinook - 1998 (with Terry Glavin)

Anthologies
In the Wake of the War Canoe - 1981
Dreams of Freedom: Bella Coola, Cape Scott, Sointula - 1982
Warriors of the North Pacific: Missionary Accounts of the Northwest Coast, The Skeena and Stikine Rivers, and the Klondike, 1829-1900 - 1984
Nootka - 1986
The Ghostland People - 1989
The Call of the Coast - 1992

References

External links

Charles Lillard at BC Bookworld
Charles Lillard fonds at University of Victoria, Special Collections

1944 births
1997 deaths
American expatriate writers in Canada
Historians of Alaska
Historians of British Columbia
Historians of the Pacific Northwest
Writers from Long Beach, California
People from Ketchikan, Alaska
People from the Capital Regional District
Writers from British Columbia
20th-century Canadian poets
Canadian male poets
20th-century American poets
20th-century Canadian historians
20th-century Canadian male writers